The Pelaco Tournament was a golf tournament held in Australia from 1955 to 1959. Peter Thomson won the event four of the five times it was contested. Total prize money for the 90-hole tournament was £2,500. The sponsor was Pelaco, an Australian shirt manufacturer.

Winners

References

Golf tournaments in Australia
Recurring sporting events established in 1955
Recurring events disestablished in 1959
1955 establishments in Australia